Milan Šedivý (born 17 June 1967) is a Czech football referee. He was a full international for FIFA until 2005, and is known to have served as a referee in international matches in 2003.

References

External links
Milan Šedivý on WorldReferee.com

1967 births
Living people
Czech football referees